Wasseralfingen station is a railway station on the Ries Railway in the city of Aalen, located in the Ostalbkreis district in Baden-Württemberg, Germany. The train services are operated by Go-Ahead Baden-Württemberg and Go-Ahead Bayern.

The local ironworks, in operation since 1671, had been one of the primary reasons to build the first railway in the region. The Stuttgart-Bad Cannstatt–Aalen railway and the first section, Aalen-Wasseralfingen, of today's Ries Railway were opened in 1861. The extension to Nördlingen followed in 1863. The ironworks still exist as a company (SHW), but are now mostly an automotive supplier and do not use the railway any more.

References 

Railway stations in Baden-Württemberg
Buildings and structures in Ostalbkreis